Joshua Yaro (born 18 November 1994) is a Ghanaian footballer who currently plays for St. Louis City SC in Major League Soccer.

Youth and college soccer 
Joshua moved to the United States on a scholarship to attend Cate School in Carpinteria, California where he played soccer. Yaro played three years of college soccer at Georgetown University between 2013 and 2015.

While at college, Yaro also appeared for Premier Development League side Baltimore Bohemians in 2014.

Professional career 
On 11 January 2016, Yaro was selected 2nd overall in the 2016 MLS SuperDraft by Philadelphia Union. He made his professional debut with the Union's USL Championship affiliate club, Bethlehem Steel, on 25 March, starting in a 1–0 win over FC Montréal.

Following his release by Philadelphia, Yaro joined San Antonio FC on 11 January 2019. After two seasons in San Antonio, he joined San Diego Loyal SC ahead of the 2021 campaign.

Personal
Yaro earned his U.S. green card in July 2017. This status also qualifies him as a domestic player for MLS roster purposes.

References

External links 
 Georgetown Hoyas Profile
 

1994 births
Living people
Ghanaian footballers
Association football defenders
Georgetown Hoyas men's soccer players
Baltimore Bohemians players
Philadelphia Union players
Philadelphia Union II players
San Antonio FC players
San Diego Loyal SC players
Philadelphia Union draft picks
USL League Two players
Major League Soccer players
USL Championship players
Expatriate soccer players in the United States
Footballers from Kumasi
People from Carpinteria, California
All-American men's college soccer players
MLS Next Pro players
St. Louis City SC 2 players